Jan Hendrik Scholte (January 5, 1910 in Weesp – June 1, 1976 in Amsterdam) was a Dutch water polo player who competed in the 1928 Summer Olympics. He was part of the Dutch team in the 1928 tournament. He played both matches and scored one goal.

References

1910 births
1976 deaths
People from Weesp
Dutch male water polo players
Water polo players at the 1928 Summer Olympics
Olympic water polo players of the Netherlands
Sportspeople from North Holland
20th-century Dutch people